Epistemology is a major branch of philosophy and is concerned with the nature and scope of knowledge. The epistemology of Wikipedia has been a subject of interest from the earliest days of its existence.

Early analysis related the epistemology of Wikipedia to social epistemology. Other realms of epistemological research, such as the epistemology of testimony and epistemic value theory, have been studied with reference to Wikipedia.

More recent analysis suggests that the epistemology of Wikipedia derives from the combined epistemic values of wikis and of encyclopedias. Jankowski
cites Ruth and Houghton
who define the epistemic values of wikis as:
self-identification
collaboration
co-construction
cooperation
trust in the community
constructionism

Jankowski suggests that determination of the epistemic values of encyclopedias is more problematic, requiring genre analysis. This analysis revealed that encyclopedias value:
utility
systematic organization
authority
trust in experts
consistency

Fallis previously identified the specific epistemic virtues of Wikipedia as
power
speed
fecundity

References

Wikipedia, Epistemology of
Wikipedia reliability